The Spread of the Eagle is a nine-part serial adaptation of three sequential history plays of William Shakespeare, Coriolanus, Julius Caesar, and Antony and Cleopatra, produced by the BBC in 1963. It was inspired by the success of An Age of Kings (1960), which it was unable to rival.  The episodes also aired in West Germany in 1968-69 and in 1972.

The series was recorded directly to film, and so persevered by the BBC Film Library, meaning all episodes still exist.

The episodes

"The Hero"
 First transmitted: 3 May 1963
 Running time: 50 minutes
 Content: Coriolanus, Acts I and II.

Cast

 Robert Hardy as Caius Martius Coriolanus
 Roland Culver as Menenius Agrippa
 Beatrix Lehmann as Volumnia
 Frank Pettingell as Junius Brutus
 Bernard Lloyd as Citizen
 Terry Wale as Citizen
 Michael Graham Cox as Citizen
 Paul Bailey as Citizen
 Roy Herrick as Messenger
 Maurice Colbourne as Roman Senator
 Noel Johnson as Cominius
 Roger Croucher as Titus Lartius
 Peter Jeffrey as Sicinius Velutus
 David King as Volsce Senator
 Paul Harris as Volsce Senator
 Jerome Willis as Tullus Aufidius
 Jennifer Daniel as Virgilia
 Hilary Wright as Gentlewoman
 Mary Steele as Valeria
 John Greenwood as Messenger
 Raymond Clarke as Roman Soldier
 David Weston as Roman Soldier
 Leonard Cracknell as Roman Soldier
 Ben Harte as Roman Soldier
 Geoffrey Hinsliff as Roman Soldier
 Charles Laurence as Roman Lieutenant
 John Barcroft as Lieutenant to Aufidius
 Hugh Dickson as The Aedile

"The Voices"
 First transmitted: 10 May 1963
 Running time: 50 minutes
 Content: Coriolanus, Acts II, III, and IV.

Cast

 Robert Hardy as Caius Martius Coriolanus
 Roland Culver as Menenius Agrippa
 Beatrix Lehmann as Volumnia
 Frank Pettingell as Junius Brutus
 Maurice Colbourne as Roman Senator
 John Gay as Roman Senator
 Peter Jeffrey as Sicinius Velutus
 Noel Johnson as Cominius
 Paul Webster as Officer
 David King as Officer
 Bernard Lloyd as Citizen
 Terry Wale as Citizen
 Michael Graham Cox as Citizen
 Paul Bailey as Citizen
 Raymond Clarke as Citizen
 Bernard Finch as Citizen
 Barry Jackson as Citizen
 Roger Croucher as Titus Lartius
 Hugh Dickson as The Aedile
 Ben Harte as The Aedile
 Jennifer Daniel as Virgilia

"The Outcast"
 First transmitted: 17 May 1963
 Running time: 50 minutes
 Content: Coriolanus, Acts IV and V.

Cast

 Robert Hardy as Caius Martius Coriolanus
 Roland Culver as Menenius Agrippa
 Beatrix Lehmann as Volumnia
 Frank Pettingell as Junius Brutus
 Raymond Clarke as Volsce Citizen
 Paul Bailey as Serving-man
 Charles Laurence as Serving-man / Volsce Conspirator
 David Weston as Serving-man / Volsce Conspirator
 Jerome Willis as Tullus Aufidius
 Peter Jeffrey as Sicinius Velutus
 Bernard Lloyd as Ritiyeno
 Terry Wale as Ritiyeno
 Michael Graham Cox as Ritiyeno
 Hugh Dickson as The Aedile
 Ben Harte as The Aedile
 John Greenwood as Messenger
 Roy Herrick as Messenger
 Noel Johnson as Cominius
 John Barcroft as Lieutenant to Aufidius
 Paul Harris as Volsce Sentry
 Barry Jackson as Volsce Sentry
 Jennifer Daniel as Virgilia
 Mary Steele as Valeria
 Kirk Martin as Young Martius
 Geoffrey Hinsliff as Messenger
 Roger Croucher as Messenger
 Maurice Colbourne as Roman Senator
 Leonard Cracknell as Volsce Conspirator
 David King as Volsce Lord
 John Gay as Volsce Lord
 Bernard Finch as Volsce Lord

"The Colossus"
 First transmitted: 24 May 1963
 Running time: 50 minutes
 Content: Julius Caesar, Acts I and II.

Cast

 Keith Michell as Mark Antony
 Peter Cushing as Caius Cassius
 Barry Jones as Julius Caesar
 Paul Eddington as Marcus Brutus
 Hugh Dickson as Flavius
 David Weston as A Carpenter
 David King as Marullus
 Terry Wale as A Cobbler
 Jack May as Casca
 Yvonne Bonnamy as Calpurnia
 Paul Webster as A Soothsayer
 John Gay as Cicero
 Roy Herrick as Lucius
 John Barcroft as Trebonius
 Jerome Willis as Decius Brutus
 Roger Croucher as Cinna
 Leonard Cracknell as Metellus Cimber
 Jane Wenham as Portia
 Bernard Finch as Caius Ligarius

"The Fifteenth"
 First transmitted: 31 May 1963
 Running time: 50 minutes
 Content: Julius Caesar, Acts II, III, and IV.

Cast

 Keith Michell as Mark Antony
 Peter Cushing as Caius Cassius
 Barry Jones as Julius Caesar
 Paul Eddington as Marcus Brutus
 David William as Octavius Caesar
 John Greenwood as A Servant to Caesar
 Yvonne Bonnamy as Calpurnia
 Jerome Willis as Decius Brutus
 Bernard Lloyd as Publius
 Jack May as Casca
 Bernard Finch as Caius Ligarius
 John Barcroft as Trebonius
 Paul Bailey as Artemidorus
 Jane Wenham as Portia
 Roy Herrick as Lucius
 Paul Webster as A Soothsayer
 Paul Harris as Popilius Lena
 Roger Croucher as Cinna
 Leonard Cracknell as Metellus Cimber
 Terry Wale as A Servant to Antony
 Charles Laurence as A Servant to Octavius Caesar
 Geoffrey Hinsliff as Plebeian
 David Weston as Plebeian
 Barry Jackson as Plebeian
 Ben Harte as Plebeian
 Hugh Dickson as Cinna, a Poet
 Brian Oulton as Lepidus

"The Revenge"
 First transmitted: 7 June 1963
 Running time: 50 minutes
 Content: Julius Caesar, Acts IV and V.

Cast

 Keith Michell as Mark Antony
 Peter Cushing as Caius Cassius
 Barry Jones as Julius Caesar
 Paul Eddington as Marcus Brutus
 David William as Octavius Caesar
 Roger Croucher as Lucilius
 Charles Laurence as Pindarus
 Paul Webster as Soldier
 Raymond Clarke as Soldier
 Roy Herrick as Lucius
 Hugh Dickson as Titinius
 John Gay as A Poet
 John Barcroft as Messala
 Paul Harris as Varro
 Ben Harte as Claudius
 Terry Wale as A Messenger
 David Weston as Cato
 Barry Jackson as Soldier
 Paul Bailey as Soldier
 Geoffrey Hinsliff as Clitus
 John Greenwood as Dardanius
 David King as Volumnius
 Bernard Lloyd as Strato

"The Serpent"
 First transmitted: 14 June 1963
 Running time: 50 minutes
 Content: Antony and Cleopatra, Acts I and II.

Cast

 Keith Michell as Mark Antony
 Mary Morris as Cleopatra
 George Selway as Domitius Enobarbus
 David William as Octavius Caesar
 Charles Laurence as Philo
 David Weston as Demetrius
 Jill Dixon as Charmian
 John Barcroft as Alexas
 Paul Bailey as A Soothsayer
 Lucy Young as Iras
 John Greenwood as Messenger from Sicyon
 Brian Oulton as Lepidus
 Leonard Cracknell as Messenger to Caesar
 David King as Mardian
 Jerome Willis as Pompey
 Barry Jackson as Menecrates
 Geoffrey Hinsliff as Menas
 Ben Harte as Varrius
 John Gay as Maecenas
 Alan Rowe as Agrippa
 Nancie Jackson as Octavia
 Hugh Dickson as Messenger to Cleopatra
 Terry Wale as Eros
 Roger Croucher as Dolabella
 Bernard Lloyd as Scarus

"The Alliance"
 First transmitted: 21 June 1963
 Running time: 50 minutes
 Content: Antony and Cleopatra, Acts II, III, and IV.

Cast

 Keith Michell as Mark Antony
 Mary Morris as Cleopatra
 George Selway as Domitius Enobarbus
 David William as Octavius Caesar
 Jerome Willis as Pompey
 Brian Oulton as Lepidus
 Geoffrey Hinsliff as Menas
 Alan Rowe as Agrippa
 Nancie Jackson as Octavia
 John Barcroft as Alexas
 Jill Dixon as Charmian
 Lucy Young as Iras
 Hugh Dickson as Messenger
 Terry Wale as Eros
 John Gay as Maecenas
 David Weston as Canidius
 Paul Harris as Taurus
 Bernard Lloyd as Scarus
 Roger Croucher as Dolabella
 David King as An Ambassador
 Charles Laurence as Thidias
 John Greenwood as Servant to Cleopatra

"The Monument"
 First transmitted: 28 June 1963
 Running time: 50 minutes
 Content: Antony and Cleopatra, Acts IV and V.

Cast

 Keith Michell as Mark Antony
 Mary Morris as Cleopatra
 George Selway as Domitius Enobarbus
 David William as Octavius Caesar
 Terry Wale as Eros
 Geoffrey Hinsliff as A Soldier
 Jill Dixon as Charmian
 Lucy Young as Iras
 Alan Rowe as Agrippa
 Ben Harte as Messenger to Caesar
 Barry Jackson as A Soldier of Caesar's
 Bernard Lloyd as Scarus
 John Greenwood as A Centurion
 Paul Webster as Sentry
 Roy Herrick as Sentry
 David King as Mardian
 Charles Laurence as Dercetas
 Leonard Cracknell as Guardsman
 John Barcroft as Guardsman
 Bernard Finch as Guardsman
 Paul Harris as Guardsman
 David Weston as Diomedes
 Hugh Dickson as An Egyptian
 Roger Croucher as Dolabella
 John Gay as Maecenas
 Paul Bailey as A Clown

In popular culture
In July 1963, comedian Jimmy Edwards spoofed the series in an episode of More Faces of Jim entitled "Spreadeagling".

References

External links
 Review
 
 The spread of the eagle at Screenonline

1963 British television series debuts
1963 British television series endings
1960s British drama television series
BBC television dramas
BBC Television shows
Black-and-white British television shows
English-language television shows
Films based on works by William Shakespeare
Shakespearean histories
Television shows based on plays
Depictions of Julius Caesar on television
Cultural depictions of Mark Antony
Cultural depictions of Cicero
Cultural depictions of Marcus Junius Brutus
Depictions of Augustus on television